Hardesty may refer to:

Places

United States
 Hardesty, Maryland, also known as Queen Anne
 Hardesty, Oklahoma

People 
 Bob Hardesty (1931–2013), American educator
 Brandon Hardesty (born 1987), American comedic performer and actor
 David C. Hardesty Jr. (born 1946), American lawyer and educator
 Gwynneth (Hardesty) Coogan (born 1965), American athlete
 Herbert Hardesty (1925–2016), American musician
 James Hardesty (born 1948), chief justice of the Nevada Supreme Court
 Jo Ann Hardesty (born 1957), Portland City Commissioner
 Montario Hardesty (born 1987), American football player
 Paul Hardesty (born 1963), American lobbyist and politician
 Sally Hardesty, fictional character
 Scott Hardesty (1870–1944), American baseballer
 Sue Hardesty (1933-2022), American author